Ptilophorus is a genus of wedge-shaped beetles in the family Ripiphoridae. There are at least three described species in Ptilophorus.

Species
These three species belong to the genus Ptilophorus:
 Ptilophorus dufourii (Latreille, 1817)
 Ptilophorus fischeri Ménétriés
 Ptilophorus wrightii (LeConte, 1868)

References

Further reading

 
 
 

Ripiphoridae
Articles created by Qbugbot